Sharlie is a nickname that may refer to the following:

Sharlie, American folklore subject
Sharlie Rockstar, stagename of Jesús Luna Pozos, who is best known as Charly Manson, (born 1975), Mexican luchador

See also

Sharlee D'Angelo
Sharly Mabussi
Sharpie (disambiguation)